Tiit Sokk (born 15 November 1964) is a retired Estonian professional basketball player and current coach. Often cited as one of the very best European point guards of his generation, he is widely recognized as the greatest Estonian basketball player in history. Elected to the Hall of fame of Estonian basketball in 2010.

Professional career
Sokk was awarded the Estonian best male athlete award in 1988. He won the Soviet Union League title in 1991 with Kalev Tallinn, and ended his career as a player in 1997, after playing a season with Aris in Greece.

National team career
Sokk's most notable achievement was winning the Olympic gold medal as a member of the Soviet Union national team at the 1988 Summer Olympics. He also won two FIBA World Cup silver medals in 1986 and 1990, as well as the bronze medal at EuroBasket 1989.

Coaching career
After his playing career, Sokk founded a basketball school in Estonia, and coached in the Estonian Basketball League. He also was head coach of the Estonia national team during two different stints from (2004–2007) and (2009–2019).

Personal life
Tiit Sokk has two sons, Tanel and Sten, who also play professional basketball at the international level for Estonian teams BC Tartu and Kalev/Cramo respectively. During his career in Greece he played under the name Tout Giannopoulos.

Achievements 
Kalev Tallinn
2× Soviet Estonian champion: 1984, 1985
Soviet Union League champion: 1991
Estonian League champion: 1992
Estonian Basketball Hall of Fame: 2010

Panathinaikos
3× Greek League runner-up: 1993, 1995, 1996
2× Greek Cup winner: 1993, 1996

References

External links
 Tiit Sokk at basketpedya.com
 
 
 
 

1964 births
Living people
Aris B.C. players
Basketball players at the 1988 Summer Olympics
Estonian basketball coaches
Estonian expatriate basketball people in Greece
Estonian men's basketball players
Greek Basket League players
Greek basketball coaches
Honoured Masters of Sport of the USSR
Medalists at the 1988 Summer Olympics
Naturalized citizens of Greece
Olympic basketball players of the Soviet Union
Olympic gold medalists for the Soviet Union
Olympic medalists in basketball
Panathinaikos B.C. players
Point guards
Soviet men's basketball players
Sportspeople from Tartu
Tallinn University of Technology alumni
1986 FIBA World Championship players
1990 FIBA World Championship players
KK Kalev players
Estonia national basketball team coaches